WOWL (91.9 FM) is a radio station licensed to the community of Burnsville, Mississippi, and serving the greater Northeast Mississippi, area. The station is owned by Southern Community Services, Inc. with studios located in Iuka, Mississippi. It airs an adult contemporary music format. 91.9 MHz is assigned to non-commercial stations in the United States, and WOWL follows FCC guidelines for program underwriting.

The station was assigned the WOWL call letters by the Federal Communications Commission on October 12, 1999. Until 1999, this had been the long-time callsign for television station WHDF in Florence, Alabama.

On November 25, 2022, WOWL added some Christian programming.

Translators

References

External links

OWL
Adult album alternative radio stations in the United States
Tishomingo County, Mississippi
Radio stations established in 1999
1999 establishments in Mississippi